RWBY Chibi is an American animated comedy web series produced by Rooster Teeth Animation for Rooster Teeth. It is a spin-off of RWBY, where each episode consists of several scenes where aspects of RWBY's characters are usually exaggerated for comic effect. The series was first announced as part of Rooster Teeth's 13th Anniversary celebration on April 1, 2016 and premiered May 7. In January 2017, Rooster Teeth confirmed the second season's premiere on May 13, 2017 on Rooster Teeth and May 20, 2017 on YouTube. A third season premiered on January 27, 2018 on Rooster Teeth and February 3, 2018 on YouTube.

A trailer released on May 13, 2021 revealed that RWBY Chibi would continue via Rooster Teeth's upcoming animated anthology series Neon Konbini, which premiered on May 27.

On March 4, 2023 the series' fourth season made it's debut with the episode "Cool as Coco" (Season 4, Episode 1) on the "Rooster Teeth Animation" YouTube channel. In the first episode's description, it is noted that it was "originally aired as part of Neon Konbini".

Voice cast

 Lindsay Jones as Ruby Rose
 Kara Eberle as Weiss Schnee
 Arryn Zech as Blake Belladonna
 Barbara Dunkelman as Yang Xiao Long
 Miles Luna as Jaune Arc
 Jen Brown as Pyrrha Nikos
 Neath Oum as Lie Ren
 Samantha Ireland as Nora Valkyrie
 Michael Jones as Sun Wukong
 Kerry Shawcross as Neptune Vasilias

Development
RWBY Chibi was announced by Gray Haddock in April 2016. RWBY Chibi can be described as a comedy series consisting of two to five segments per episode. Each episode has a run time of about three to seven minutes. The series uses both the RWBY characters and world, but is animated in a different art style. RWBY Chibi is not considered to be canon, with characters repeatedly breaking the fourth wall. The first season premiered on May 7, 2016, and consisted of 24 episodes, which were aired weekly at the usual RWBY release time on Saturdays. It concluded on October 15, 2016, just one week before the release of the RWBY Volume 4 premiere. A second season of RWBY Chibi premiered on Rooster Teeth's web site on May 13, 2017. The third season premiered on January 27, 2018.

The show was thought to have been cancelled midway through Season 3 due to the show's production workload being too much for the company on top of additional projects being undertaken by the animation department at the time. However, this rumor was then disproven when a fourth season of sorts was revealed as part of Rooster Teeth's new animation block Neon Konbini.

In 2023, a "fourth" season of the show began airing on the "Rooster Teeth Animation" YouTube Channel. Based on the description of the 1st episode ("Cool as Coco"); the fourth season seems to be isolated "RWBY Chibi" bits from the "Neon Konbini" series.

Episodes

Season 1 (2016)

Season 2 (2017)

Season 3 (2018)

Season 4 (2023)

References

External links
 
 
 

RWBY
2016 web series debuts
2010s American adult animated television series
American adult animated comedy television series
American adult animated web series
American adult animated television spin-offs
Anime-influenced Western animated television series
Animated television series about monsters
Schools in fiction